Olga Fridman was the defending champion, but chose not to participate.

Maryna Zanevska won the title, defeating Elena Gabriela Ruse in the final, 6–3, 6–3.

Seeds

Main draw

Finals

Top half

Bottom half

References 
 Main draw

Open Engie de Touraine - Singles